Maulana Gul Naseeb Khan  is a Pakistani politician who served as a Member of the Senate of Pakistan, from March 2006 to March 2012. He belongs to Village Laram of Adenzai Tehsil in Lower Dir District of Khyber Pakhtunkhwa, Pakistan.

Education
He holds masters degree in Islamiat.

Political Career
Gul Naseeb joined Jamiat Ulema-e-Islam (F) and soon he became a popular leader for Adenzai Tehsil. He was elected as Senator in 2006. He served the Senate of Pakistan until 2012. He held different positions within his party as well. He served as Chief Election Commissioner JUI in 2002. He served as Chief Executive for Dew-a-Band International Conference in 2002.He also served as C.E. of Tahafuz-e-Deeni Madaris.

Separation from Jamiat Ulema-e-Islam (F)

Gul Naseeb had many issues with party head Fazal-ur-Rehman. After strong criticism on party policies, Muhammad Khan Sherani and Gul Naseeb were expelled from the party in late 2020. 

Gul Naseeb Khan joined Imran Khan against the controversial government of Pakistan Democratic Movement in 2022.

References

Living people
Members of the Senate of Pakistan
Year of birth missing (living people)